Vegas de Coria is a village and alqueria located in the municipality of Nuñomoral, in Cáceres province, Extremadura, Spain. As of 2020, it has a population of 220.

Geography 
Vegas de Coria is located 168km north-northeast of Cáceres, Spain.

References

Populated places in the Province of Cáceres